Yelena Grigoryevna Rudkovskaya (born 21 April 1973 in Gomel) is a Belarusian swimmer and Olympic champion. She competed at the 1992 Olympic Games in Barcelona, where she received a gold medal in 100 m breaststroke, and a bronze medal in 4×100 m medley relay.

References

External links
 

1973 births
Living people
Sportspeople from Gomel
Belarusian female breaststroke swimmers
Soviet female breaststroke swimmers
Olympic swimmers of the Unified Team
Swimmers at the 1992 Summer Olympics
Olympic gold medalists for the Unified Team
Olympic bronze medalists in swimming
European Aquatics Championships medalists in swimming
Medalists at the 1992 Summer Olympics
Olympic bronze medalists for the Unified Team
Olympic gold medalists in swimming
Universiade medalists in swimming
Universiade bronze medalists for Belarus